The Men's Pole Vault was an event at the 1992 Summer Olympics in Barcelona, Spain. There were a total number of 34 participating athletes from 23 nations. The maximum number of athletes per nation had been set at 3 since the 1930 Olympic Congress. The qualification mark was set at 5.60 metres (six + six athletes).

This was a remarkably clean competition, with only three athletes having a miss at a height that was not their best or better in the competition. Maksim Tarasov took gold with only three attempts, clean through 5.80. Igor Trandenkov equalled Tarasov, but took three attempts to clear 5.80. Javier García took bronze in his home town by clearing 5.75 on his second attempt, to edge Kory Tarpenning who cleared it on his third. It was the second consecutive Games that Soviet or former Soviet vaulters won the event; Spain earned its first men's pole vault medal with García's bronze.

Background

This was the 22nd appearance of the event, which is one of 12 athletics events to have been held at every Summer Olympics. The returning finalists from the 1988 Games were gold medalist Sergey Bubka of the Soviet Union (now the Unified Team), fifth-place finisher Philippe Collet of France, seventh-place finisher István Bagyula of Hungary, eighth-place finisher Philippe d'Encausse of France, ninth-place finisher Asko Peltoniemi of Finland, tenth-place finisher Kory Tarpenning of the United States, and thirteenth-place finisher Hermann Fehringer of Austria. Bubka was an "overwhelming favorite" to repeat; in addition to the 1988 Olympic gold, he had won all three world championships held to date (1983, 1987, and 1991), set 14 world records, and been the only man to clear 20 feet.

Cyprus, Israel, Latvia, Mauritius, New Zealand, the Philippines, and Portugal each made their men's pole vaulting debut; twelve of the fifteen former Soviet republics competed together as the Unified Team. The United States made its 21st appearance, most of any nation, having missed only the boycotted 1980 Games.

Competition format

The competition used the two-round format introduced in 1912, with results cleared between rounds. Vaulters received three attempts at each height. Ties were broken by the countback rule.

In the qualifying round, the bar was set at 4.80 metres, 5.00 metres, 5.20 metres, 5.30 metres, 5.40 metres, 5.50 metres, 5.55 metres, and 5.60 metres. All vaulters clearing 5.60 metres advanced to the final. If fewer than 12 cleared that height, the top 12 (including ties) advanced.

In the final, the bar was set at 5.20 metres, 5.30 metres, 5.40 metres, 5.50 metres, and then increased by 5 centimetres as a time.

Records

These were the standing world and Olympic records (in metres) prior to the 1992 Summer Olympics.

No new world or Olympic records were set during the competition. The following national records were established during the competition:

Schedule

All times are Central European Summer Time (UTC+2)

Results

Qualifying

The qualifying round was held on Wednesday August 5, 1992. Qualification rule: Qualifying performance 5.60 (Q) or at least 12 best performers (q) advance to the final.

Final

The final was held on Friday August 7, 1992.

See also
 1988 Men's Olympic Pole Vault (Seoul)
 1990 Men's European Championships Pole Vault (Split)
 1991 Men's World Championships Pole Vault (Tokyo)
 1993 Men's World Championships Pole Vault (Stuttgart)
 1994 Men's European Championships Pole Vault (Helsinki)

References

External links
 Official Report
 Results

P
Pole vault at the Olympics
Men's events at the 1992 Summer Olympics